Derrick "Ricky" Scott Reynolds (born January 19, 1965 in Sacramento, California), is a former professional American football player who was selected by the Tampa Bay Buccaneers in the second round of the 1987 NFL Draft. A 6' 0", 195-lb. cornerback from Washington State University, Reynolds played in 10 NFL seasons from 1987 to 1996 for the Tampa Bay Buccaneers and New England Patriots. Over the course of his career, Reynolds totaled 23 interceptions, two of which he returned for touchdowns. Reynolds spent most of his year as a left-side cornerback, though he played the right side in 1993 for the Buccaneers and in 1996 for the Patriots. Reynolds also returned two fumble recoveries for touchdowns and returned a blocked field goal attempt for a touchdown.

Reynolds graduated from Luther Burbank High School, Sacramento, California in 1983.

1965 births
Living people
American football cornerbacks
Players of American football from Sacramento, California
Tampa Bay Buccaneers players
New England Patriots players
Washington State Cougars football players
Ed Block Courage Award recipients